Conus richeri is a species of sea snail, a marine gastropod mollusk in the family Conidae, the cone snails and their allies.

Like all species within the genus Conus, these snails are predatory and venomous. They are capable of "stinging" humans; therefore, live ones should be handled carefully or not at all.

Description
The size of the shell varies between 32 mm and 54 mm.

Distribution
This marine species occurs off New Caledonia and the Chesterfield Islands.

References

 Tucker J.K. & Tenorio M.J. (2009) Systematic classification of Recent and fossil conoidean gastropods. Hackenheim: Conchbooks. 296 pp.
 Puillandre N., Duda T.F., Meyer C., Olivera B.M. & Bouchet P. (2015). One, four or 100 genera? A new classification of the cone snails. Journal of Molluscan Studies. 81: 1–23
 Richard, G. & Moolenbeek, R., 1988. Two New Conus Species from Deep Waters of New Caledonia. Venus 47(4): 233–239

External links
 The Conus Biodiversity website
 Cone Shells - Knights of the Sea
 
 Holotype in MNHN, Paris

richeri
Gastropods described in 1988